Tomato (born Chris Harfenist August 17, 1969) is an American musician who is best known for being the lead singer and drummer for the alternative rock band Sound of Urchin.  Tomato was born in New York City, grew up in Rockland County, NY, and presently resides in Brooklyn, NY.  He also plays drums in The Moistboyz as well as Dave Dreiwitz from Ween's "Crescent Moon". Tomato was mentored by Gary Chester, author of Modern Drummer Publication's drum book "The New Breed".  Tomato has also played drums for Ween, as well as for Ellen Foley and the Dirty Old Men, and recorded drums with Tenacious D for the Comedy Central Crank Yankers version of "The Friendship Song".  Tomato also has appeared on an episode of the Nickelodeon kids show The Naked Brothers Band (TV series), as guest drummer along with Questlove and Claude Coleman, Jr. Tomato is also married to internet celebrity Lori Harfenist, host of The Resident.

In 2009, in addition to playing with Sound of Urchin, Tomato opened his own after school music program in New York City entitled "Tomato's House Of Rock" [THOR].  Previously Tomato was the Music Director for the NYC Branch of the Paul Green School of Rock.

On April 30, 2010, the formation of DiamondSnake was announced.  The heavy metal band's members include Tomato as well as Moby, Dave Hill (Valley Lodge) and Phil Costello (Satanicide, Valley Lodge).

In April 2012, Tomato opened a second branch of Tomato's House Of Rock in Cobble Hill, Brooklyn, NY.   As stated in the Village Voice: "New York City is a bastion of educational institutions, but one of its most innovative educators doesn't even have a teaching certificate. What he does have is a lifetime of experience as a rock musician, a passion for imparting real-world skills to kids, and two schools—one in Hell's Kitchen and one in Brooklyn.  He goes by Tomato. His school: Tomato's House of Rock, or THOR."

In Fall 2012, the first season of the Louder Education web series debuted on the Metal Injection website, with Tomato and Alex Skolnick as hosts.  "Louder Education, their just-announced new web show, will follow hosts Alex Skolnick (from Testament... like you didn’t know that!), Chris “Tomato” Harfenist (Sound of Urchin), and a different special guest every week as they educate (see what I did there?) the students at T.H.O.R. (Tomato's House of Rock) about the music business and artistic growth, and, of course, lead “a kick-ass jam with the kids.”

Bands
 Sound of Urchin
 Moistboyz
 Crescent Moon
 DiamondSnake

Discography

Early pre-official SOU 4-track albums (1994-1998)

Official SOU Studio albums (1998–present)

Moistboyz

References

Living people
American rock singers
American male singers
Singers from New York City
1969 births
20th-century American drummers
American male drummers
20th-century American male musicians